Zhongtang is a town under the direct jurisdiction of the prefecture-level city of Dongguan in the Pearl River Delta region of Guangdong Province, China. , it has five residential communities and 15 villages under its administration.

References

Geography of Dongguan
Towns in Guangdong